Missoula station may refer to:

Missoula station (Northern Pacific Railway), a former Northern Pacific and Amtrak station in Missoula, Montana
Missoula station (Milwaukee Road), a former Milwaukee Road station in Missoula, Montana